As of December 2015, now-defunct Air Méditerranée operated flights to the following scheduled destinations. It additionally offered many charter flights from UK and European airports to Lourdes in France.

Destinations

Bulgaria
Varna – Varna Airport

Egypt
Luxor – Luxor International Airport

France
Bordeaux – Mérignac Airport
Lyon – Lyon-Saint Exupéry Airport focus city
Marseille – Provence Airport
Montpellier – Montpellier – Méditerranée Airport
Nantes – Atlantique Airport focus city

Spain
Ibiza – Ibiza Airport
Jerez de la Frontera – Jerez Airport
Majorca – Palma de Mallorca Airport
Málaga – Málaga Airport
Seville – San Pablo Airport

External links 
Air Méditerranée

References 

Lists of airline destinations